The New Caledonia catshark or Kanakorum catshark (Aulohalaelurus kanakorum) is a catshark of the family Scyliorhinidae in the order Carcharhiniformes, known only from one specimen collected near southwestern New Caledonia in the western central Pacific Ocean. The holotype measured . The New Caledonia catshark is a rare and vulnerable inshore catshark found around coral reefs.

References

 

Aulohalaelurus
Endemic fauna of New Caledonia
Fish of New Caledonia
Fish of the Pacific Ocean
Vulnerable fish
Vulnerable fauna of Oceania
Fish described in 1990